The following are the national records in athletics in Saint Lucia maintained by its national athletics federation: Saint Lucia Athletics Association (SLAA).

Outdoor

Key to tables:

+ = en route to a longer distance

h = hand timing

A = affected by altitude

* = irregular wind conditions

Mx = mark was set in a mixed race

i = indoor mark

OT = oversized track (> 200m in circumference)

Men

Women

Indoor

Men

Notes - 200m 21.42A Ronald Promesse 22.02.97 Colorado Springs : oversized track
21.22A Ronald Promesse 28.02.98 Colorado Springs : oversized track

Women

Junior

Men

Women

Notes

References
General
World Athletics Statistic Handbook 2022: National Outdoor Records
World Athletics Statistic Handbook 2022: National Indoor Records
Specific

External links
SLAA official webpage

Saint Lucia
Records
Athletics